Justice Sherwood may refer to:

Carl G. Sherwood (1855–1938), associate justice of the South Dakota Supreme Court
Thomas Adiel Sherwood (judge) (1834–1918), associate justice and chief justice of the Missouri Supreme Court
Thomas R. Sherwood (1827–1896), associate justice and chief justice of the Michigan Supreme Court

See also 
Sherwood (disambiguation)